Otnurok is a rural locality (a selo) and the administrative centre of Nursky Selsoviet, Beloretsky District, Bashkortostan, Russia. The population was 239 as of 2010. There are 12 streets.

Geography 
Otnurok is located 23 km northwest of Beloretsk (the district's administrative centre) by road. Otnurok (village) is the nearest rural locality.

References 

Rural localities in Beloretsky District